Świdno may refer to the following places:
Świdno, Lublin Voivodeship (east Poland)
Świdno, Grójec County in Masovian Voivodeship (east-central Poland)
Świdno, Świętokrzyskie Voivodeship (south-central Poland)
Świdno, Węgrów County in Masovian Voivodeship (east-central Poland)